Andreas Matthias Reinke (born 3 December 1962) is a German rower. He competed in the men's quadruple sculls event at the 1988 Summer Olympics.

References

External links
 
 
 

1962 births
Living people
German male rowers
Olympic rowers of West Germany
Rowers at the 1988 Summer Olympics
Sportspeople from Braunschweig